Maithili Thakur (born 25 July 2000) is an Indian playback singer trained in Indian classical music and Folk Music. She has sung original songs, covers, and traditional folk music prominently in Hindi, Bengali, Maithili, Urdu, Marathi, Bhojpuri, Punjabi, Awadhi, Braj, Tamil, English and more Indic languages.

Early life
Thakur was born in Benipatti, Madhubani district, Bihar to a Maithil musician and music teacher working in Delhi Pandit Ramesh Thakur and Bharti Thakur. She is named after goddess Sita as well as her mothertongue. Maithili, along with her two brothers, Rishav and Ayachi were trained by their grandfather and father in Maithili Folk, Hindustani classical music, Harmonium and Tabla. Realising his daughter's potential around the age of 6, her father relocated themselves to Dwarka in New Delhi for better opportunities. Maithili and her brothers studied at Bal Bhavan International School where they won for the school at various State and National Level Competitions.

She was interested in learning singing since her childhood age. She started learning music from her grandfather when she was only 4 years old. Maithili's first music master is her grandfather. At the age of 10, she started singing at jagrans and other musical functions.

Music career
In 2011, Thakur appeared in Little Champs, a singing competition television series telecast in Zee TV. Four years later, she contested in Indian Idol Junior, telecast in Sony TV. She won the "I Genius Young Singing Star" competition in 2016, following which she launched her album, Ya Rabba (Universal Music).

Rising stars
In 2017, Thakur was a contestant in the season 1 of Rising Star, a television singing competition. Maithili was the first finalist of the show, singing Om Namah Shivaya which gained her direct entry into the final. She was runner up, losing out by just two votes. Following the show, her internet popularity rose significantly.

2019 onwards
After a huge success from videos on Facebook and YouTube the trio has been performing at various National and    International Events, Literature Fests. Maithili has been awarded Atal Mithila Samman by the Government of India.

In 2019 Maithili and her two brothers, Rishav and Ayachi, were made the brand ambassadors of Madhubani by the Election Commission. Rishav is on the tabla and Ayachi is a singer and performs often on percussion as well.

Manaspath

Maithali Thakur on her YouTube channel along with her two younger brother Rishav and Ayachi sings famous Ramcharitmanas by Tulsidas. This Manaspath gives a huge success to Maithali as well as to her brothers. Currently they are on 268th episode and couplet (doha) no. 168 of Ayodhya kanda as of 13th August 2022.

References

External links

Living people
2000 births
People from Madhubani district
21st-century Indian women singers
21st-century Indian singers
Bhojpuri playback singers
Indian YouTubers